The Metro Manila Film Festival Award for Best Editing is an award presented annually by the Metropolitan Manila Development Authority (MMDA). It was first awarded at the 1st Metro Manila Film Festival ceremony, held in 1975; Edgardo Vinarao won the award for his editing in Diligin mo ng Hamog ang Uhaw na Lupa and it grants to a film exhibiting the finest editing for work in a motion picture. Currently, nominees and winners are determined by Executive Committees, headed by the Metropolitan Manila Development Authority Chairman and key members of the film industry.

Winners and nominees

1970s

1980s

1990s

2000s

2010s

2020s

Notes

References

External links
IMDB: Metro Manila Film Festival
Official website of the Metro Manila Film Festival

Editing
Film editing awards